Ahmad Toukan (Ahmad Tuqan) (15 August 1903 – 5 January 1981) was a Jordanian political leader of Palestinian descent who was the 20th Prime Minister of Jordan from 26 September 1970 to 28 October 1970.

Overview
Tuqan was born on 15 August 1903 in Nablus, Palestine.

He is the eldest brother of Ibrahim Touqan and Fadwa Touqan, both of whom are famous poets in the Arab world.

Education
 BSc Engineering Sciences, American University of Beirut, 1925.
 MSc Physics, University of Oxford, 1929.

Career

Toukan occupied many high-ranking positions both locally and internationally:
 UNESCO Expert and UNRWA Deputy Head of Education (1954–1961)
 Education Expert at the International Bank for Reconstruction & Development (1962–1966)
 Minister (including Foreign Minister, Minister of State and Deputy Prime Minister during the years 1950–1970)
 Prime Minister in 1970
 Chief of the Royal Hashemite Court of Jordan in 1972
 Chairman of University of Jordan's Board of Trustees in 1972.

Toukan was prime minister in 1970 during a crackdown that drove the PLO guerillas out of Jordan.

Death
He died in Jordan on 12 September 1981 at age 78 after a prolonged illness. The Ahmad Toukan School in Amman is named in his honor.

See also
 List of prime ministers of Jordan

References

External links
Jordan Prime Ministry website

Prime Ministers of Jordan
Government ministers of Jordan
Construction ministers of Jordan
Transport ministers of Jordan
Education ministers of Jordan
Foreign ministers of Jordan
State ministers of Jordan
Deputy prime ministers of Jordan
Defence ministers of Jordan
Tourism ministers of Jordan
Interior ministers of Jordan
Municipal affairs ministers of Jordan
Alumni of the University of Oxford
American University of Beirut alumni
Ahmad
1903 births
1981 deaths
Jordanian people of Palestinian descent
Members of the Senate of Jordan
People from Nablus
Academic staff of Palestine Technical University